A push poll is an interactive marketing technique, most commonly employed during political campaigning, in which an individual or organization attempts to manipulate or alter prospective voters' views under the guise of conducting an opinion poll. Large numbers of voters are contacted with little effort made to collect and analyze voters' response data. Instead, the push poll is a form of telemarketing-based propaganda and rumor mongering, masquerading as an opinion poll. Push polls may rely on innuendo, or information gleaned from opposition research on the political opponent of the interests behind the poll.

Generally, push polls are viewed as a form of negative campaigning. Indeed, the term is commonly (and confusingly) used in a broader sense to refer to legitimate polls that aim to test negative political messages. Future usage of the term will determine whether the strict or broad definition becomes the most favored definition. However, in all such polls, the pollster asks leading questions or suggestive questions that "push" the interviewee toward adopting an unfavourable response toward the political candidate in question.

Legislation in Australia's Northern Territory defined push-polling as any activity conducted as part of a telephone call made, or a meeting held, during the election period for an election, that: (a) is, or appears to be, a survey (for example, a telephone opinion call or telemarketing call); and (b) is intended to influence an elector in deciding his or her vote.

Push polling has been condemned by the American Association of Political Consultants and the American Association for Public Opinion Research.

Origin 
Richard Nixon was one of push polling's pioneers. In his very first campaign, a successful 1946 run for the U.S. House against Democratic incumbent Jerry Voorhis, voters throughout the district reported receiving telephone calls that began: "This is a friend of yours, but I can't tell you who I am. Did you know that Jerry Voorhis is a communist?" (Voorhis was not) – at which point the caller hung up. A citizen reported that she worked for the Nixon campaign for $9 a day, in a telephone-bank room where the attack calls were made. Nixon later admitted he knew Voorhis was not a communist, but the important thing was to win.

Types and their effects 
The mildest forms of push polling are designed merely to remind voters of a particular issue. For instance, a push poll might ask respondents to rank candidates based on their support of an issue in order to get voters thinking about that issue.

Many push polls are negative attacks on other candidates. These attacks often contain suggestions not stated as facts. They ask questions such as "If you knew that Candidate Smith was being investigated for corruption, would you be more likely to vote for him, or less likely?" The question does not state that any investigation has taken place, so it is not a lie, but it puts in the respondent's mind the idea that Candidate Smith may be corrupt.

True push polls tend to be very short, with only a handful of questions, to maximise the number of calls that can be made. Any data obtained (if used at all) is secondary in importance to the resulting negative effect on the targeted candidate. Legitimate polls are often used by candidates to test potential messages. They frequently ask about either positive and negative statements about any or all major candidates in an election and always include demographic questions.

The main advantage of push polls is that they are an effective way of maligning an opponent ("pushing" voters toward a predetermined point of view) while avoiding direct responsibility for the distorted or false information suggested (but not directly alleged) in the push poll. They are risky for this same reason: if credible evidence emerges that the polls were directly ordered by a campaign or candidate, it could do serious damage to that campaign. Push polls are also relatively expensive, having a far higher cost per voter than radio or television commercials. Consequently, push polls are most used in elections with fewer voters, such as party primaries, or in close elections where a relatively small change in votes can make the difference between victory or defeat.

Examples

Australia 
In March 2011, The Daily Telegraph reported that the Australian Labor Party was referred to the New South Wales Electoral Commission after it was alleged to have used "push polling" in Newcastle to discredit independent candidate John Stuart Tate. Labor Party officials employed a market research firm to conduct the polling, telling voters that Tate was the Labor mayor of Newcastle, when in fact he was not. It has been suggested that Labor was worried its brand was so damaged in one of its traditional seats that it branded the popular independent as one of its own to discredit him. Labor polling firm Fieldworks Market Research admitted to the Telegraph reporter that the script used when calling voters branded Tate a "Labor" candidate, but said the script was provided by the Labor Party. It is not known, at least in public, whether the Electoral Commission responded to this referral.

United States 

George W. Bush used push polls in his 1994 bid for Texas Governor against incumbent Ann Richards. Callers asked voters "whether they would be more or less likely to vote for Governor Richards if they knew that lesbians dominated on her staff".

In the 2000 United States Republican Party primaries, it was alleged that George W. Bush's campaign used push polling against the campaign of Senator John McCain. Voters in South Carolina reportedly were asked "Would you be more likely or less likely to vote for John McCain for president if you knew he had fathered an illegitimate black child?" This hypothetical question seemed like a suggestion, although without substance. It was heard by thousands of primary voters.

In the 2008 presidential election, Jewish voters in several states were targeted by various push polls that linked Barack Obama to various anti-Israel positions. For example, various push polls suggested that Obama was a Muslim; that his church was anti-American and anti-Israel; that he often met pro-Palestinian leaders in Chicago (and had met PLO leaders); that a Hamas leader had endorsed an Obama victory; and that he had called for a summit of Muslim nations excluding Israel if elected president. The Jewish Council for Education and Research, an organization that endorsed Obama, denounced the push polls as disinformation and lies.

Political consultant Lee Atwater was also well known for using push-polling among his aggressive campaign tactics, though apologised for this in later life.

Amid widespread controversy over the Trump administration's executive order restricting immigration from the Middle East, the Republican Party sent out a poll to supporters on February 17, 2017 entitled "Mainstream Media Accountability" which included such questions as "Do you believe that the media unfairly reported on President Trump’s executive order temporarily restricting people entering our country from nations compromised by radical Islamic terrorism?" and "Were you aware that a poll was released revealing that a majority of Americans actually supported President Trump's temporary restriction executive order?" Similar tactics have been used by the Trump campaign throughout the 2020 United States presidential election.

During the 2016 presidential race, a push poll campaign was run to boost presidential candidate Hillary Clinton against her primary opponent Bernie Sanders, wherein a thinly disguised negative attack ad was posited as a legitimate poll.

Legal actions
The parliament of the Northern Territory (Australia) has legislated to restrict push polling in that, during an election, the caller is required to identify his/her name and address.

The state legislature has attempted to restrict the practice in New Hampshire.

See also 
 Astroturfing
 Attack ad
 Dog-whistle politics
 Fear mongering
 Smear campaign
 Wedge issue – Wedge politics

References

External links 
 Warning from the National Council on Public Polls
 Tales of a Push Pollster Retrieved 2012-03-07
 Don't Call Them Push Polls by Stuart Rothenberg
 When Push Comes to Polls
 The Truth About Push Polls

Political campaign techniques
Types of polling
Ethically disputed political practices